Dr. P. Shankar Rao is an Indian veteran politician from the state of Telangana. He is a member of Indian National Congress Party and has been elected representative on five occasions, as a Member of a Legislative Assembly in Andhra Pradesh.

Early and personal life 
Shankar Rao is the eldest son to P Rajaiah and Raja Narsamma. He has two younger brothers Penta Dayanand, Penta Jagannath and three sisters M Shakuntala, K Saraswathi, and G Jyothi. P Shankar Rao married G. Vishwashanti eldest daughter of G. Venkatswamy (popularly known as Kaka) a member of the Indian National Congress (INC) political party who was elected 7 times (4 times from Peddapalli Lok Sabha and 3 times from Siddipet Lok Sabha). He has two Sons P Shashank and P Sanjay, and one Daughter P Sushmita.

Career
Rao was first elected in 1983, as an MLA for the Shadnagar constituency. He was subsequently re-elected for that constituency on three (1989, 1999, 2004) more occasions. He served as Irrigation Minister in Kotla Vijaya Bhaskara Reddy's cabinet. Along with Y. S. Rajasekhara Reddy, the then CLP leader, he played a key role as Deputy CLP Leader when the party was in the opposition.

He was elected from Secunderabad Cantonment Constituency in 2009, this being his first appointment from that constituency but his fifth term as MLA, overall. He did not contest the 2014 elections.

He held different posts in the party and government in his political career of more than four decades. He was a minister for Government of Andhra Pradesh (before bifurcation) for the second time in Kiran Kumar Reddy cabinet. His portfolios were Public Enterprises, Handlooms & Textiles, Small Scale Industries, Khadi and Village Industries & Spinning Mills.. He has served as Cabinet Minister two times in his career.

He has been a staunch supporter of Telangana statehood. .

Controversies 
Shankar Rao had filed a case in the High Court (HC) against Jagan Mohan Reddy (current Chief Minister of Andhra Pradesh), for being in possession of illegal and disproportionate assets. The HC had issued show cause notices to all the concerned parties based on reports submitted by Shanker Rao and several others.

Shankar Rao is also involved in a protracted land grab case of Greenfields in Kanojiguda, Hyderabad and a case was booked against him after a complaint  filed by the Green Fields Plot Owners Association. The case is ongoing in the high court of Telangana.

References

Indian National Congress politicians from Telangana
Telugu politicians
Politicians from Hyderabad, India
Living people
Andhra Pradesh MLAs 1983–1985
Andhra Pradesh MLAs 1989–1994
Andhra Pradesh MLAs 1999–2004
Andhra Pradesh MLAs 2004–2009
Andhra Pradesh MLAs 2009–2014
Year of birth missing (living people)